Alessandra Bonfiglioli (born 5 December 1963) is an Italian female retired high jumper, which participated at the 1987 World Championships in Athletics.

Achievements

References

External links
 

1963 births
Living people
Italian female high jumpers
World Athletics Championships athletes for Italy